William Edwards may refer to:

Arts and entertainment
William Edwards (architect) (1719–1789), Welsh architect of the Pontypridd bridge in south Wales
William Camden Edwards (1777–1855), Welsh engraver
William Augustus Edwards (1866–1939), American architect in Atlanta
William Albert Edwards (1888–1976), American architect in Santa Barbara, California
William John Edwards (1898–1978), Welsh singer
William J. Edwards (architect) (fl. 1907), American architect, designed the Washington School (Grand Forks, North Dakota)

Military
William Edwards (United States Navy officer) (c. 1790–1813), American navy officer
William D. Edwards (1849–1903), American soldier and Medal of Honor recipient
William Mordaunt Marsh Edwards (1855–1912), English army officer, awarded the Victoria Cross in the Sudan

Politics and law
William Edwards (17th century MP) (fl. 1645), British politician, MP for the City of Chester
William P. Edwards (1835–1900), American lawyer, soldier, member-elect to the U.S. Congress from Georgia
William Henry Edwards (politician) (1857–1950), Canadian manufacturer and politician
William Edwards (Wisconsin politician) (1861–1944), American politician, Wisconsin state senator
Don Edwards (William Donlon Edwards, 1915–2015), U.S. Representative from California
Jack Edwards (American politician) (William Jackson Edwards, 1928–2019), U.S. Representative from Alabama
William Edwards (British politician) (1938–2007), British politician, MP for Merionethshire
W. Cary Edwards (William Cary Edwards, 1944–2010), American politician, Attorney General of New Jersey

Sports
William Edwards (1831–1898), American harness racing pioneer
William Edwards (Kent cricketer) (1859–1947), English cricketer
William Edwards (Cornwall cricketer) (born 1938), English cricketer
William Edwards (rugby union) (born 1995), English rugby union and rugby sevens player

Others
William Edwards (inventor) (1770–1851), American inventor, grandson of Jonathan Edwards
William Frédéric Edwards (1777–1842), French physiologist, of Jamaican background
William Henry Edwards (1822–1909), American entomologist
William Cameron Edwards (1844–1921), Canadian businessman and parliamentarian
William Edwards (school inspector) (1851–1940), Welsh school inspector
William F. Edwards (1906–1989), American businessman, educator and professor at Brigham Young University
Willie Edwards (1932–1957), African American murdered by the Ku Klux Klan

See also
Bill Edwards (disambiguation)
William Edwardes (disambiguation)
William Edward (disambiguation)